Enter the Guardsman is a musical based on Ferenc Molnár's play The Guardsman, with music by Craig Bohmler, lyrics by Marion Adler and a book by Scott Wentworth.

The story concerns an actor who tests his actress wife's love by sending her roses as a secret admirer and disguising himself as a guardsman in order to seduce her.

Enter the Guardsman won the first International Musical of the Year competition in Aarhus, Denmark in 1996. The musical was first presented in 1997 at the Donmar Warehouse in London, in a sponsorship between the Donmar and the Really Useful Group. It was nominated for the Olivier Award for Best New Musical in 1998. A further production played at the Dimson Theatre in New York City in 2000.

References

1997 musicals
Off-Broadway musicals